Jørn Didriksen (born 27 August 1953) is a former speed skater from Norway.

Representing Oslo Idrettslag, Didriksen specialised in the sprint and participated in the World Sprint Championships three times. His best result there was a fourth place in 1975. That same year, he also became Norwegian Sprint Champion. At the 1976 Winter Olympics of Innsbruck, he won a silver medal on the 1,000m behind Peter Mueller.

Personal records
To put these personal records in perspective, the WR column lists the official world records on the dates that Didriksen skated his personal records.

External links
 
 Jørn Didriksen at SkateResults.com
 Personal records from Jakub Majerski's Speedskating Database
 Historical World Records. International Skating Union.
 National Championships results. Norges Skøyteforbund (Norwegian Skating Association).

1953 births
Living people
Norwegian male speed skaters
Speed skaters at the 1976 Winter Olympics
Olympic speed skaters of Norway
Olympic silver medalists for Norway
Olympic medalists in speed skating
Medalists at the 1976 Winter Olympics
20th-century Norwegian people